Eriogonum heracleoides (common names; parsnipflower buckwheat, whorled buckwheat, and Wyeth buckwheat) is a plant of western North America that has many flowering clusters which are usually cream colored, or off-white. It can usually be found in rocky areas, such as sagebrush deserts and Ponderosa pine forests. Parsnipflower buckwheat is in the genus Eriogonum and the family Polygonaceae, which is a family of plants known as the "knotweed family". It inhabits much of the western part of the United States and southern British Columbia.

Description
Blooming early in the summer, its flowers measure ; these are pale yellow and redden with age. The hairs feel woolly and matted, and cover both sides of the leaf. The flowers have one carpel (achene). The plant has a whorled arrangement of leaves at midpoint of the stem as well as one beneath the base of the stems. It blooms in early to mid summer. It attracts butterflies, bees, insects, and birds and is the host plant for several Palouse butterflies.

References

Further reading

External links

 cwnp.org: Eriogonum heracleoides
 Parsnipflower Buckwheat

heracleoides
Flora of the Northwestern United States
Flora of California
Flora of Nevada
Plants described in 1834
Flora without expected TNC conservation status